Abagrotis vittifrons is a moth of the family Noctuidae first described by Augustus Radcliffe Grote in 1864. It is found in North America from eastern North Dakota and south-western Saskatchewan west to the southern interior of British Columbia, south to southern California, Arizona and New Mexico.

The wingspan is about 34–35 mm. Adults are on wing from August to September in one generation depending on the location.

References

vittifrons
Moths of North America
Moths described in 1864